Sir Sidney Colvin (18 June 1845 – 11 May 1927) was a British curator and literary and art critic, part of the illustrious Anglo-Indian Colvin family. He is primarily remembered for his friendship with Robert Louis Stevenson.

Family and early life
He was born on 18 June 1845 in West Norwood, in what is now London, at St. John's Lodge on Knight's Hill, a nine bedroom, twenty-one acre estate, to Bazett David Colvin, an East India merchant, and Mary Steuart, daughter of William Butterworth Bayley, Chairman of the East India Company Both sides of his family were connected to British India, his father as a partner in the trading company of Crawford, Colvin, and Co., with offices in Calcutta and London. (This connected the family with Robert Wigram Crawford, the Whig politician.) His uncle John Russell Colvin, lieutenant-governor of the North-West Provinces during the mutiny of 1857, gave him ten cousins, including the lawyer Walter Mytton and Auckland, also lieutenant-governor of the North-West Provinces (and Oudh).

Colvin's childhood was spent at The Grove, Little Bealings, Suffolk, as Bazett David inherited the estate in 1847 from his father James. The house and estate had literary and artistic connections: James had purchased it in 1824 from Perry Nursey, the landscape painter and teacher of Thomas Churchyard; Nursey had often entertained David Wilkie RA at Little Bealings, and was friends with Edward Fitzgerald, translator of The Rubayat of Omar Khayyam.

Education and career
A scholar of Trinity College, Cambridge, Colvin became a fellow of his college in 1868. In 1873 he was Slade Professor of Fine Art, and was appointed in the next year to the directorship of the Fitzwilliam Museum.

He wrote numerous articles on fine arts subjects (including Sandro Botticelli, Albrecht Dürer, Fine Arts, Leonardo da Vinci and Michelangelo) for the ninth edition (1875–89) of the Encyclopædia Britannica.

In 1878, 114 Old Master engravings, which Colvin had purchased for the museum from London art dealer A. W. Thibaudeau, were stolen by a hansom cab driver. Although the driver was tracked down and charged, the engravings were never recovered and Colvin was required to cover their cost. Colvin paid the £1,537 10s to Thibaudeau from his own salary in instalments for many years, having initially to borrow £400 from Robert Louis Stevenson; a debt which he was still repaying to his friend in 1884.

In 1884 he moved to London on his appointment as keeper of prints and drawings in the British Museum. His chief publications are lives of Walter Savage Landor (1881) and Keats (1887), in the English Men of Letters series; editions of the letters of Keats (1887); A Florentine Picture-Chronicle (1898), and Early History of Engraving in England (1905).

In the field both of art and of literature, Colvin's fine taste, wide knowledge and high ideals made his authority and influence extend far beyond his published work.

Frances Jane Sitwell and Robert Louis Stevenson
In the early 1870s Colvin met the woman who was to become his wife, many decades later. Frances Jane (1839–1924), née Fetherstonhaugh, was married to Rev. Albert Hurt Sitwell (1834–1894), a Church of England vicar (variously in Calcutta, Stepney, and Thanet). The Sitwells had two sons: one died as a child, and one lived to early adulthood, Frances Albert 'Bertie' Sitwell (1862–1881). Their marriage was unhappy, so they lived apart and she earned her living as an essayist.

In late summer 1873, Colvin became friends with Robert Louis Stevenson, then a young man and an unpublished author. Soon after their first meeting he had placed Stevenson's first paid contribution, an essay, "Roads", in The Portfolio. Both men were attracted to Sitwell; Stevenson wrote to her for years.  Despite or because of this attraction, the men remained firm friends. Stevenson dedicated Travels with a Donkey in the Cévennes to Colvin, who became his literary adviser.

Colvin was a significant editor of Stevenson's, preparing the Edinburgh edition of his works (1894–97); the Vailima Letters (1899), which Stevenson chiefly addressed to him; and the posthumous collection of Letters (2 volumes, London, 1900). These publications made Colvin an authority on Stevenson's life and work. He also wrote the sketch of Stevenson for the Dictionary of National Biography (vol. liv.), and was to have written an authoritative Life, intended for publication simultaneously with the Letters, but was obliged to relinquish the task to Graham Balfour.

Sitwell and Colvin married on 7 July 1903, following the death of her husband and his mother. They had 20 years of married life, before she died on 1 August 1924. The couple were the subject of a 1928 biography by E. V. Lucas. According to the literary critic R. L. Calder, the Colvins were models for Mr and Mrs Barton Trafford in W. Somerset Maugham's 1930 Cakes and Ale.

Later life and death
Colvin was knighted in 1911.  The citation reads
Sidney Colvin, Esq., D.Litt
Keeper of Prints and Drawings at the British Museum since 1884 and member of many learned bodies.  Slade Professor of Fine Art at Cambridge from 1873 to 1895, author of several publications on literature and the fine arts and contributor to the "Encyclopædia Britannica" and "Dictionary of National Biography" &c.  Born in 1845.

Notes

References

Further reading
New General Catalog of Old Books and Authors brown

External links

 
 
 
 

1845 births
1927 deaths
Alumni of Trinity College, Cambridge
Sidney
Employees of the British Museum
English art critics
English curators
Fellows of Trinity College, Cambridge
Knights Bachelor